The Paul Hornung Award is a college football award that was created in January 2010 by the Louisville Sports Commission in Louisville, Kentucky, with the support of Paul Hornung, a member of the College Football Hall of Fame and the Pro Football Hall of Fame.  The mission of the award is to recognize and reward versatile, high-level performers in major college football; to help preserve the legacy of Hornung, one of Louisville's native sons and sports icons; and to promote Louisville as a great sports town.

Eligibility criteria
To be eligible, a candidate must be in good standing and eligible on his team during the selection process, eligible with the NCAA during the selection process and play significant time during most or all of the season. Decisions regarding status for the award will be made by the Oversight Committee.  In addition to starting or playing significant downs on offense or defense, candidates will be measured by performance from among one or more of the following:
 Playing multiple positions on offense and/or multiple positions on defense
 Playing a significant role on special teams
 Performing as a two-way player who starts either on offense or defense and is used on the other side of the ball in some capacity
 Making a significant impact during big games and elevating the team's performance through leadership displayed by excelling in multiple roles

Winners

References

College football national player awards
Awards established in 2010
Sports in Louisville, Kentucky
2010 establishments in Kentucky